The following highways are numbered 719:

Costa Rica
 National Route 719

India
 National Highway 719 (India)

United States